The Land is an English language newspaper published in Sydney and later in North Richmond, New South Wales by Australian Community Media. The newspaper commenced publication in 1911.

History

The Land first appeared in 1911 as a two penny broadsheet. It was originally published by the Farmers and Settlers' Association of New South Wales and later Rural Press, which merged with Fairfax Media.

In 1930, Harry J. Stephens took up the post of editor; from 1906 to 1920, he had been the driving force behind the paper's chief opposition, The Farmer and Settler.

Digitisation
The paper has been digitised as part of the Australian Newspapers Digitisation Program project of the National Library of Australia.

See also 
List of newspapers in Australia
List of newspapers in New South Wales

References

External links 
 The Land (website)
 

Newspapers published in Sydney
Newspapers on Trove